Elaphopsis is a genus of beetles in the family Cerambycidae, containing the following species:

 Elaphopsis earinus Martins & Napp, 1989
 Elaphopsis rubidus Audinet-Serville, 1834

References

Graciliini